Bruno may refer to:

People and fictional characters
Bruno (name), including lists of people and fictional characters with either the given name or surname
 Bruno, Duke of Saxony (died 880)
 Bruno the Great (925–965), Archbishop of Cologne, Duke of Lotharingia and saint
 Bruno (bishop of Verden) (920–976), German Roman Catholic bishop
 Pope Gregory V (c. 972–999), born Bruno of Carinthia
 Bruno of Querfurt (c. 974–1009), Christian missionary bishop, martyr and saint
 Bruno of Augsburg (c. 992–1029), Bishop of Augsburg
 Bruno (bishop of Würzburg) (1005–1045), German Roman Catholic bishop
 Pope Leo IX (1002–1054), born Bruno of Egisheim-Dagsburg
 Bruno II (1024–1057), Frisian count or margrave
 Bruno the Saxon (fl. 2nd half of the 11th century), historian
  Saint Bruno of Cologne (d. 1101), founder of the Carthusians
 Bruno (bishop of Segni) (c. 1045–1123), Italian Roman Catholic bishop and saint
 Bruno (archbishop of Trier) (died 1124), German Roman Catholic bishop
 Bruno II of Berg (c. 1100–1137), Archbishop of Cologne and chips
Giordano Bruno (1548–1600), Italian Dominican friar, philosopher, mathematician, poet, cosmological theorist, and Hermetic occultist
Bruno (footballer, born 1970), full name Bruno Alexandre Vaza Ferreira, Portuguese former footballer
Bruno (footballer, born 1980), full name Bruno Saltor Grau, Spanish former footballer
Bruno (footballer, born 1984), full name Bruno Fernandes das Dores de Souza, Brazilian footballer and convicted murderer
Bruno (footballer, born 1989), full name Bruno Moreira Silva, Brazilian footballer
Bruno (footballer, born 1994), full name Bruno Nogueira Barbosa, Brazilian footballer, playing in Moldova
Bruno (footballer, born 1999), full name Bruno Moreira Soares, Brazilian footballer, playing in Colombia
Bruno Pesaola (1925–2015), Italian Argentine football player and manager
Henri Reynders (1903–1981), Catholic priest, under the name Dom Bruno, credited with saving 400 Jews during the Holocaust
Bruno Brookes (born 1959), British DJ born Trevor Neil Brookes

Places

United States 
Bruno, Arkansas, an unincorporated community
Bruno Township, Butler County, Kansas
Bruno, Minnesota, a city
Bruno Township, Pine County, Minnesota
Bruno, Nebraska, a village
Bruno, West Virginia, an unincorporated census-designated place

Elsewhere 
Bruno, Saskatchewan, Canada, a town
Bruno, Indonesia, a subdistrict in Purworejo Regency of Central Java
Bruno, Piedmont, Italy, a comune (municipality) in the Province of Asti

Entertainment
Brüno, a 2009 feature film starring Sacha Baron Cohen
Bruno (2000 film), a 2000 American film directed by and starring Shirley MacLaine
Bruno (1988 film), a 1988 Filipino film starring Max Laurel
Bruno (webcomic), written and drawn by Christopher Baldwin
It's Bruno!, 2019 TV series about a puggle named Bruno

Other uses
Bruno's, a grocery store chain based in Birmingham, Alabama
Bruno (software), the first commercial WYSIWYG presentation program
PC Bruno, a World War II Polish-French intelligence station outside Paris
Bruno the bear (disambiguation), several fictional and nonfictional bears

See also
Bruneau (disambiguation)
Bruni (disambiguation)
San Bruno (disambiguation)
Brno, the second largest city in the Czech Republic
Bruno Jura Hound, a hunting dog